Amphitrite is a sea goddess of Greek mythology.

Amphitrite may also refer to:

Ships

Military
 HMS Amphitrite, seven ships of the British Royal Navy
 USS Amphitrite, three ships of the US Navy
 Amphitrite-class monitor, a class of four U.S. Navy monitors
 French ship Amphitrite, several ships of the French Navy
 Amfitriti, several submarines of the Hellenic Navy
  (1865-1941), part of the Hellenic Navy; yacht of the Greek Royal Family (1895-1917), floating military hospital (1918), school ship and submarine supply ship (1934); sunk in April 1941
HM Amphitrite, a Royal Netherlands Navy corvette in service in the 1830s (and possibly other Dutch ships)
  (1978), a multipurpose Swedish Coast Guard vessel

Civilian
 Amphitrite (1802 ship) wrecked off Boulogne en route Australia in 1833
 , a 44-m British then German schooner currently belonging to 
  (1927), a French oyster sloop classified as a monument historique
  (2001), a luxury yacht once belonging to American actor Johnny Depp

Other uses
 Amphitrite Point Lighthouse, a lighthouse near Ucluelet, British Columbia, Canada
 29 Amphitrite, an asteroid named for the sea goddess
 Amphitrite (polychaete), a genus of worms of the polychaete family Terebellidae
 Amphitrite (fungus), a genus of fungi in the family Halosphaeriaceae
 Amphitrite Pool, a shallow ceremonial pool on the grounds of the United States Merchant Marine Academy with a statue of Amphitrite